The Eurocopter (now Airbus Helicopters) AS550 Fennec (now H125M) and AS555 Fennec 2 are lightweight, multipurpose military helicopters manufactured by Eurocopter Group (now Airbus Helicopters). Based on the AS350 Ecureuil and AS355 Ecureuil 2 series, they are named after the fennec fox. The armed versions of the AS550 and AS555 can be fitted with coaxial weapons, rockets, torpedoes and various other munitions.

Design

Operational history
As a result of the Vienna Treaty, military variants of the Écureuil were marketed under a separate designation; thus from 1990 onwards the type was marketed as the Fennec.

In February 2007, India selected the AS550 C3 Fennec over the Bell 407 helicopter in a deal for 197 helicopters worth US$500 million. This deal was suspended in June 2007 because of concerns of alleged corruption in the bidding process, and cancelled outright on 6 December 2007. The contract is now being re-competed, and the AS550 C3 is among the helicopters competing for the deal. However India chose Kamov Ka-226T over AS550 C3 in the refreshed tender.

On 20 January 2011, Royal Malaysian Navy PASKAL commandos rescued a hijacked Malaysian chemical tanker and its crew from Somali pirates. A Fennec helicopter provided reconnaissance and aerial gunfire to keep the pirate's mother ship at bay while commandos boarded the tanker.

Variants
Single engine
 AS350 L1/L2 Ecureuil – Original military variants of AS350.
 AS550 C2 Fennec – Armed version based on AS350 B2.
 AS550 U2 Fennec – Unarmed version based on AS350 B2.
 AS550 C3 Fennec – Armed version based on AS350 B3.

Twin engine
 AS355 M/M2 Ecureuil 2 – Original military variants of AS355 F.
 AS555 AF Fennec 2 – Armed version based on AS355 N.
 AS555 AN Fennec 2 – Armed military version, can be fitted with a 20 mm cannon.
 AS555 AR Fennec 2 – Armed with cannon and rockets.
 AS555 MN Fennec 2 – Unarmed naval version.
 AS555 MR Fennec 2 – Naval version.
 AS555 SN Fennec 2 – Armed naval version.
 AS555 SR Fennec 2 – Armed naval version.
 AS555 UN Fennec 2 – Training and utility version.
 AS555 UR Fennec 2 – Utility version.
 AS555 SP Fennec 2 – Naval version of AS355 NP.

Operators

 Argentine Naval Aviation

Brazilian Air Force
 Brazilian Army
Brazilian Navy

 Chadian Air Force

 Colombian Navy

 Royal Danish Air Force

 Ecuadorian Army

 French Air and Space Force
 French Army

Indonesian Army

Kenya Air Force

 Royal Malaysian Navy

 Mexican Navy

 Pakistan Army Aviation Corps

 Qatar Emiri Air Force.

Tanzania Air Force Command

Royal Thai Army

Uzbekistan Air and Air Defence Forces

Former operators

Republic of Singapore Air Force

Specifications (AS550 C3)

See also

References

Notes

Bibliography 
 Jackson, Paul. Jane's All The World's Aircraft 2003–2004. Coulsdon, UK:Jane's Information Group, 2003. .

External links

 Official webpage
 Danish AS 550 Fennec

Fennec
Airbus Helicopters aircraft
Military helicopters
1990s French helicopters
Single-turbine helicopters